Guerrilla Girl is a 1953 American thriller film directed by John Christian and written by John Byrne, William Koch, William Kyriakis and Ben Parker. The film stars Helmut Dantine, Marianna, Irene Champlin, Ray Julian, Michael Vale and Charlotte Paul. It was released on January 23, 1953 by United Artists.

Plot
Under the Axis occupation of Greece in World War II, two lovers resist the Nazis but become separated at the war's end. Years later, he is a Greek government official and she is on the side of the communist revolutionaries. She then finds her lover's name on an execution list.

Cast 
Helmut Dantine as Demetri Alexander
Marianna as Zaira
Irene Champlin as Nina Christos
Ray Julian as Comrade Vanda
Michael Vale as Pavel Danov
Charlotte Paul as Comrade Lakme
Gerald Lee as Spiro
Dora Weissman as Toula, Nina's maid

References

External links
 

1953 films
American black-and-white films
United Artists films
1950s thriller films
American thriller films
1950s English-language films
1950s American films